Papilliconus radulfivillensis is an extinct species of sea snail, a marine gastropod mollusk, in the family Conidae, the cone snails and their allies.

Distribution
Fossils of this marine species were found in France.

References

 Tracey S., Craig B., Belliard L. & Gain O. (2017). One, four or forty species? - early Conidae (Mollusca, Gastropoda) that led to a radiation and biodiversity peak in the late Lutetian Eocene of the Cotentin, NW France. Carnets de Voyages Paléontologiques dans le Bassin Anglo-Parisien. 3: 1-38

radulfivillensis
Gastropods described in 2017